"Come Out and Play" (sometimes subtitled "Keep 'Em Separated") is a 1994 song by the American punk rock group the Offspring. It is the seventh track on their third album, Smash (1994), and was released as its first single. Written by frontman Dexter Holland, the song was the second single to be released by the band, after "I'll Be Waiting" (1986). It is considered the Offspring's breakthrough song, as it received widespread radio play, with first attention brought by Jed the Fish of KROQ-FM, and reached number one on the Billboard Modern Rock Tracks chart, bringing both the band and the punk rock genre to widespread attention.

The song also appears as the second track on their Greatest Hits album (2005).

Composition
Dexter Holland said that most songs on Smash "were just about whatever was happening in front of me". In the case of "Come Out And Play", it was about gang and school violence: "Back then I was a grad student and I was commuting to school everyday in a shitty car, driving through East L.A. Gangland central. I was there the day of the L.A. riots. So I was very aware of that part of the world, and a lot of that gun stuff came out in songs like 'Come Out and Play'." The line "you gotta keep 'em separated" was sung by Jason "Blackball" McLean, a friend and a fan of the band. Inspiration for this line came from Dexter Holland's experience in a laboratory cooling Erlenmeyer flasks full of hot liquids.

Music video
"Come Out and Play" was the first Offspring song for which a music video was created. The music video, directed by Darren Lavett, was shot in May 1994 and debuted on MTV in the summer of that year. The video is almost entirely in black-and-white with sepia tone segments, and features the band performing the song in the garage of a house with tinfoil covering the walls. There is also footage involving dogs fighting over a chew toy with a crowd watching, a horse race, a sword fight and some clips of several snakes and snake charmers, as well as some fencing scenes. The song is a nod to the Twisted Sister 1985 album Come Out and Play.

Legal issues
In 1994, Posh Boy Records owner Robbie Fields submitted a written claim to Epitaph Records via the Harry Fox Agency, alleging that the two-bar Arabian guitar phrase repeated throughout "Come Out and Play" copied the guitar solo from "Bloodstains", a song by the Fullerton, California punk rock band Agent Orange written in 1979 to which Fields, as the song's publisher, owned the copyright. Offspring lead vocalist and primary songwriter Dexter Holland had cited "Bloodstains" as one of the songs that sparked his interest in punk rock, saying it "really influenced me, especially that Arabian-sounding lead. I've written a lot of stuff like that", and the Offspring's public admiration had brought Agent Orange increased attention. A lawsuit was not filed, as Fields said "Nobody wants to pillory anybody. But I feel I have a fiduciary duty to represent Mike Palm's interests." Palm declined to give an opinion on the matter, later noting that he was not involved in filing the claim but did not disagree with it, and invited listeners to compare the two songs, saying "Anyone who listens will know what the issue is."

The Offspring's manager Jim Guerinot called Fields' claim baseless, saying the two guitar parts were "not even close to identical. They're both in the same scale, [and] there's no doubt there's an influence, [but] it doesn't mean that it's stolen. If he feels he has something, he'll sue, and if we've done something that is proven wrong [by technical analysis of the two songs] we should be sued. But we don't feel there's any merit to it." Randall Wixen, the Offspring's music publisher, stated that a musicologist hired by Epitaph determined the two guitar parts were not identical, despite being based in the same Middle Eastern scale. "We've told [Fields] a hundred times he's not getting paid. He's not getting a cent", Wixen said in 1996, stating that Fields and Palm would have to sue if they wished to pursue the claim. Although no lawsuit was ever filed, Palm maintained that he still deserved credit for the guitar riff: "I could show you interviews in which Dexter Holland outright admits that he took that riff from my song and used it in his song," he asserted in 2000, "In the rap world, when something like that is taken as a sample, they pay for it the same way I pay for guitar strings and picks." The claim became national news when the Offspring discussed it on MTV, leading to a backlash against Palm: "Some punk kid's perception of that is to think that I'm the bad guy," he said, "but they don't understand that the Offspring are millionaires and I'm just trying to retain whatever little tiny thing is mine."

Some fellow Californian punk rock musicians criticized the allegation. Frank Agnew, guitarist of fellow Fullerton band the Adolescents, remarked "I don't see how you can call that plagiarism; all it is, is an Arabic scale. It just reeks to me [as if] people are after a piece of the pie. If the Offspring did a guitar solo that was reminiscent of one of my guitar solos, I'd be honored, not [antagonized]. I think it's real petty." The Vandals, who were signed to Holland's label Nitro Records, released the song "Aging Orange" on their 1996 album The Quickening, with lyrics by bassist Joe Escalante mocking Palm's claim to ownership of a style rooted in ancient Middle Eastern music.

Back in ancient Egypt many pharaohs went to jailFor misappropriation of my Phrygian scaleI said "Listen, Tutankhamun, you're driving me insaneIt's obvious those bellies are all dancing to 'Bloodstains'I figured out you owe me, and please try not to laughBut every time I hear it, I get one more golden calf"

Palm called the song "nothing but Joe's desperate attempt to brown-nose the Offspring", characterizing it as "lame and out of line. You think there was some ass-licking going on there?", sentiments echoed by Fields. Palm noted "Aging Orange" incorrectly implied he had sued the Offspring. Escalante, also an entertainment lawyer, said that Fields' and Palm's attempt to get money from Epitaph and the Offspring represented "the kind of crap I hate" in both the legal system and entertainment business, and that the Vandals—with their long tradition of satirizing things they perceived foolish within the punk scene—would have ridiculed the situation regardless of the parties involved. The Offspring later covered "Bloodstains" for the soundtrack of the 2000 film Ready to Rumble. "It's great that they recorded 'Bloodstains, said Palm, "but it doesn't help me personally. Sometimes I feel like an old black bluesman who got ripped off."

Alternate versions
The Offspring themselves made a middle-eastern styled instrumental version of the song. It can be heard as a hidden track at the end of Smash as well as on the "Come Out and Play" single.
The UCLA Bruin Marching Band is known to play a marching band version of "Come Out and Play".
This song was covered by Richard Cheese on his 2000 album, Lounge Against the Machine and again released on the 2006 album, The Sunny Side of the Moon.
The song is also played on wind instruments in the movie Click.
"Weird Al" Yankovic wrote a parody version entitled "Laundry Day" which was played live on his Bad Hair Day tour in 1996, but was never officially recorded for any of his albums. There are conflicting stories as to why his parody was never recorded; either Yankovic never approached the Offspring about releasing the parody, or the band denied permission.
Aside from Yankovic, five other parody versions of the song were recorded and released: "Put the Cheese Away (Keep It Refrigerated)" by Joe and the Chicken Heads (1995), "Come Out and Pray" by ApologetiX (1997), "Wrong Foot Amputated" by Bob Rivers, "Get Them Immigrated" by Manic Hispanic (2001) and "Keep Her Penetrated" by Blowfly (2006).
A master track of this song is featured in the video games Rock Band 2 and Rock Band Unplugged.
The Dollyrots covered the song in 2015, with guest vocals by Bowling For Soup's Jaret Reddick.

Alternate appearances
As well as appearing on Smash, the song also appears as the second track on their 2005 Greatest Hits album. The music video also appears on the Complete Music Video Collection DVD, which was also released in 2005.

Track listings

Cassette, CD single, 7" black vinyl and 10" picture disc

Charts and certifications

Weekly charts

Year-end charts

Certifications

References

External links
[ Song review], Allmusic

1994 singles
The Offspring songs
Songs written by Dexter Holland
Songs about prison
Protest songs
1994 songs
Epitaph Records singles